Railway Cricket Ground is a multi purpose stadium in Jaipur, Rajasthan. The ground is mainly used for organizing matches of football, cricket and other sports. The stadium has hosted nine Ranji Trophy matches  from 1964 when Rajasthan cricket team played against Delhi cricket team until 1989 but since then the stadium has hosted non-first-class matches.

References

External links 
 Cricketarchive
 Cricinfo
 North Western Railway
 Wikimapia

Defunct cricket grounds in India
Cricket grounds in Rajasthan
Sports venues in Jaipur
Sports venues completed in 1963
1963 establishments in Rajasthan
Football venues in Rajasthan
20th-century architecture in India